Joan M. Lovelace (born November 13, 1960), known professionally as Joan Lovett, is a former American television news anchor.

Early life and education 

A native of St. Louis, Missouri and Rockford, Illinois, Lovett earned a bachelor's degree in Radio/TV News and Print Journalism from Southern Illinois University in 1983. She received a Master's of Fine Arts in writing from Lindenwood University.

Professional career 

Shortly after graduating from SIU-C, Joan began her career in Broadcast Journalism at WICD-TV in Champaign, Illinois; from Champaign, she moved on to  WTLV-TV in Jacksonville, Florida.  By  the late 1980s and early 1990s, she developed a national reputation when she became a top weekday news anchor at WSVN-TV in Miami, Florida.

In November 1992, Lovett was hired by WBBM-TV as a weekend anchor, although she did not begin work at the station until spring 1993.  By the time Lovett arrived in the spring of 1993, however, she was used not as a weekend anchor but as a fill-in anchor.  In mid-1993, she and fellow anchor Penny Daniels began anchoring the station's new noon newscast.  Later that year, she began co-anchoring the station's 6 p.m. newscast with Bill Kurtis.  She moved from that newscast in late 1994 to make way for the station's hiring of Mary Ann Childers and in 1996, Lovett began co-anchoring WBBM's new 6 a.m. newscast with Dave Price, who later co-hosted CBS's "The Early Show."

During this time, Lovett was the winner of four Television Emmy Awards as well as nominated for a Peabody Award for her coverage of Hurricane Andrew.

In late 1998, Lovett obtained an early release from her contract with WBBM.  In early 1999, Lovett and her husband, Jeff Abrams, moved to the Baltimore area, where he took a behind-the-scenes news operations job at WBAL-TV.

"Though WBBM TV had long been plagued by poor ratings before I arrived, I enjoyed my exciting, if turbulent time there. I worked with some of the best in the business."

Hitting rock bottom and a tragic loss

Lovett suffered from alcoholism in the late 1990s and early 2000s, a  condition that was exacerbated, she told CBS News in 2004, by her lack of work.  After a series of drunk-driving arrests, Lovett was jailed in the Baltimore area in August 2002.  While she was in prison, Lovett's husband, Jeff Abrams, died of an apparent heart attack while jogging on October 10, 2002 at age 46. Lovett's request to attend her husband's funeral was denied.  Lovett was released from jail in April 2003 and told CBS News in 2004 that she had completed substance-abuse counseling. Joan has been sober since 2004.  She has not returned to work in broadcasting. She is now focusing on a career in writing.

Immediate Family 
Jeff is survived by his wife Joan and their two children Samantha and Jonathan.

References 

Living people
Television anchors from Chicago
American television reporters and correspondents
1960 births